Trevor William Docking (born 23 February 1952 in Burnie, Tasmania) is a former Australian cricketer who played for Tasmania from 1976 to 1980.

Trevor Docking was a left-handed batsman and very occasional leg-break bowler. He was a member of the Tasmanian team which played in the state's first ever Sheffield Shield match in 1977, and was a member of the 1978–79 Gillette Cup winning side.

See also
 List of Tasmanian representative cricketers

External links
Cricinfo Profile

1952 births
Living people
Australian cricketers
Tasmania cricketers
People from Burnie, Tasmania
Cricketers from Tasmania